Ravenswood: The Steelworkers' Victory and the Revival of American Labor is a labor history book by Kate Bronfenbrenner and Tom Juravich.

Ravenswood chronicles the story of the United Steelworkers' two-year lockout (1991–92) at the Ravenswood Aluminum plant in West Virginia, which was owned at the time by commodities trader Marc Rich. The union employed a strategy of in-depth financial and corporate research, community organizing, coalition-building and a multi-national trade union pressure campaign that united workers in West Virginia with trade unionists in Eastern and Western Europe and Latin America. Ultimately, the steel workers were able to compel the company to recognize their union and agree to a collective bargaining agreement which included a union security clause — something the company had long refused to grant.

The book is often used as a case study that identifies a "comprehensive corporate campaign" model for labor union organizing.

Publishing information
Bronfenbrenner, Kate and Juravich, Tom. Ravenswood: The Steelworkers’ Victory and the Revival of American Labor. Ithaca, N.Y.: Cornell University Press/ILR Press, 1999. 

Books about labor history
United Steelworkers
History of labor relations in the United States
Labor disputes in the United States
History books about the United States